Yashkulsky District (Yaşkulin rayon) is an administrative and municipal district (raion), one of the thirteen in the Republic of Kalmykia, Russia. It is located in the center and east of the republic. Its administrative center is the rural locality (a settlement) of Yashkul. As of the 2010 Census, the total population of the district was 15,270, with the population of Yashkul accounting for 51.5% of that number.

History
The district was established in 1920.

Administrative and municipal status
Within the framework of administrative divisions, Yashkulsky District is one of the thirteen in the Republic of Kalmykia. The district is divided into twelve rural administrations which comprise twenty-seven rural localities. As a municipal division, the district is incorporated as Yashkulsky Municipal District. Its twelve rural administrations are incorporated as twelve rural settlements within the municipal district. The settlement of Yashkul serves as the administrative center of both the administrative and municipal district.

References

Notes

Sources

Districts of Kalmykia
 
States and territories established in 1920